Helen Garner (née Ford, born 7 November 1942) is an Australian novelist, short-story writer, screenwriter and journalist. Garner's first novel, Monkey Grip, published in 1977, immediately established her as an original voice on the Australian literary scene—it is now widely considered a classic. She has a reputation for incorporating and adapting her personal experiences in her fiction, something that has brought her widespread attention, particularly with her novels, Monkey Grip and The Spare Room (2008).

Throughout her career, Garner has written both fiction and non-fiction. She attracted controversy with her book The First Stone (1995) about a sexual-harassment scandal in a university college. She has also written for film and theatre, and has consistently won awards for her work, including the Walkley Award for a 1993 Time magazine report. Adaptations of two of her works have appeared as feature films: her debut novel Monkey Grip and her true-crime book Joe Cinque's Consolation (2004)—the former released in 1982 and the latter in 2016.

Garner's works have covered a broad range of themes and subject matter. She has thrice written true-crime books: first with The First Stone, about the aftermath of a sexual-harassment scandal at a university, followed by Joe Cinque's Consolation, a journalistic novel about the court proceedings involving a young man who died at the hands of his girlfriend, which won the Ned Kelly Award for Best Crime Book, and again in 2014 with This House of Grief, about Robert Farquharson, a man who drove his children into a dam. The Australian Broadcasting Corporation (ABC) site has characterised her as one of Australia's "most important and admired writers", while The Guardian referred to her as "Australia's greatest living writer".

Early life 

Garner was born Helen Ford to Bruce and Gwen Ford (née Gadsden) in Geelong, Victoria, the eldest of six children. Her sister Catherine Ford is also a writer of fiction. Garner described her upbringing as being in an "ordinary Australian home—not many books and not much talk".

Garner attended Manifold Heights State School, Ocean Grove State School and then The Hermitage in Geelong, where she was the head prefect and dux. She left Geelong after her high school graduation at the age of 18 to study at the University of Melbourne, residing at Janet Clarke Hall, and graduating with a Bachelor of Arts degree with majors in English and French. One of her teachers at the University of Melbourne was the poet Vincent Buckley.

Between 1966 and 1972, Garner worked as a teacher at various Victorian high schools. In 1967, she also travelled overseas and met Bill Garner, whom she married in 1968 on their return to Australia, aged 25. Her only child, the actor, musician and writer Alice Garner, was born in 1969. Garner's first marriage ended in 1971.

In 1972, Garner was sacked by the Victorian Department of Education for "giving an unscheduled sex education lesson to her 13-year-old students at Fitzroy High School". She had written an essay about the lesson and published it under a pen name in The Digger, a countercultural Melbourne-based magazine. Although the October 1972 article was considered "unsolicited", Garner wrote that she had intended to give a lesson on Ancient Greece, but the textbooks given to her students had been defaced with sexually explicit drawings. As a result of those drawings, the class had posed questions to Garner relating to sex, and she decided to allow an uninhibited discussion based around their questions which, as their teacher, she vowed to answer accurately.

When her identity was revealed, she was called into the Victorian Department of Education and dismissed. The case was widely publicised in Melbourne, bringing Garner a degree of notoriety. Members of the Victorian Secondary Teachers Association went on strike in protest at the Deputy Director of Secondary Education's decision to fire Garner. Aside from her writing for The Digger, she also wrote articles for the Melbourne feminist newspaper Vashti's Voice. Garner appeared in the 1975 independent film Pure Shit, which focuses on four drug addicts searching for heroin in Melbourne.

Career

Early career and fiction writing
Garner came to prominence at a time when Australian writers were relatively few in number, and Australian women writers were, by some, considered a novelty. Australian academic and writer, Kerryn Goldsworthy, writes that "From the beginning of her writing career Garner was regarded as, and frequently called, a stylist, a realist, and a feminist".

Her first novel, Monkey Grip (1977), relates the lives of a group of fledgeling artists, single parents, drug addicts and welfare recipients living in Melbourne share-houses. In particular focus is the increasingly co-dependent relationship between single mother Nora and Javo, a flaky junkie who Nora is in love with, despite him repeatedly drifting in and out of her life. The novel, set in inner-city Melbourne suburbs Fitzroy and Carlton, was written in the domed reading room at the State Library of Victoria, after Garner's teaching dismissal. Years later she stated that she had adapted it directly from her personal diaries and based the relationship between Nora and Javo on a relationship she had with a man at the time. Other peripheral characters in the book were based on people in Garner's own social circle from Melbourne share-houses. Monkey Grip was very successful: it won the National Book Council Award in 1978 and was adapted into a film in 1982.

Goldsworthy suggests that the success of Monkey Grip may well have helped revive the careers of two older but largely ignored Australian women writers, Jessica Anderson and Thea Astley. Astley wrote of the novel that "I am filled with envy by someone like Helen Garner for instance. I re-read Monkey Grip a while ago and it's even better second time through". Critics have retrospectively applied the term Grunge Lit to describe Monkey Grip, citing its depiction of urban life and social realism as being key aspects of later works in the subgenre.

In subsequent books, she has continued to adapt her personal experiences. Her later novels are: The Children's Bach (1984) and Cosmo Cosmolino (1992). In 2008 she returned to fiction writing with the publication of The Spare Room, a fictional treatment of caring for a dying cancer patient, based on the illness and death of Garner's friend Jenya Osborne. She has also published several short story collections: Honour & Other People's Children: Two Stories (1980), Postcards from Surfers (1985) and My Hard Heart: Selected Fictions (1998).

In 1986, Australian academic and critic, Don Anderson, wrote of The Children's Bach: "There are four perfect short novels in the English language. They are, in chronological order, Ford Madox Ford's The Good Soldier, Scott Fitzgerald's The Great Gatsby, Hemingway's The Sun Also Rises and Garner's The Children's Bach." The Australian composer Andrew Schultz wrote an opera of the same name which premiered in 2008.

Garner said, in 1985, that writing novels was like "trying to make a patchwork quilt look seamless. A novel is made up of scraps of our own lives and bits of other people's, and things we think of in the middle of the night and whole notebooks full of randomly collected details". In an interview in 1999, she said that "My initial reason for writing is that I need to shape things so I can make them bearable or comprehensible to myself. It's my way of making sense of things that I've lived and seen other people live, things that I'm afraid of, or that I long for".

Not all critics have liked Garner's work. Goldsworthy writes that "It is certainly the case that Garner is someone whose work elicits strong feelings ... and people who dislike her work are profoundly irritated by those who think she is one of the best writers in the country". Novelist and reviewer, Peter Corris, wrote in his review of Monkey Grip that Garner "has published her private journal rather than written a novel", while Peter Pierce wrote in Meanjin of Honour & Other People's Children that Garner "talks dirty and passes it off as realism". Goldsworthy suggests that these two statements imply that she is not really a writer. Craven, though, argues that her novella, The Children's Bach, "should put paid to the myth of Helen Garner as a mere literalist or reporter", arguing, in fact, that it "is light-years away from any sprawling-tell-it-all naturalism, [that] it is concentrated realism of extraordinary formal polish and the amount of tonal variation which it gets from its seemingly simple plot is multifoliate to the point of being awesome".

Screen writing
She has written three screenplays: Monkey Grip (1982), written with and directed by Ken Cameron; Two Friends (1986), directed by Jane Campion for TV; and The Last Days of Chez Nous (1992), directed by Gillian Armstrong. The relationship between two characters in The Last Days of Chez Nous was loosely inspired by the extramarital affair Garner's second husband had with her sister.

Critic Peter Craven writes that "Two Friends is arguably the most accomplished piece of screenwriting the country has seen and it is characterised by a total lack of condescension towards the teenage girls at its centre".

Non-fiction writing

Garner has written non-fiction from the beginning of her career as a writer. In 1972 she was fired from her teaching job after publishing in The Digger, a counter-culture magazine, an anonymous account of frank and extended discussions she had with her students about sexuality and sexual activities. She wrote for this magazine from 1972 to 1974. In 1993, she won a Walkley Award for her Time magazine account of a murder trial following the death of a toddler at the hands of his stepfather.

One of her most famous and controversial books is The First Stone (1995), an account of a 1992 sexual harassment scandal at Ormond College. It was a best-seller in Australia but also attracted considerable criticism. Garner had received vicious hate-mail from women in Australia who accused her of derailing the feminist debate, and closing ranks with the abuser. She has since commented: "Sometimes I would have these kind of panic attacks caused by the hostility that some people showed towards me. I guess I knew there was going to be trouble, but the vitriolic nature of it gave me a bit of a shock".

Garner's other non-fiction books are: True Stories: Selected Non-Fiction (1996), The Feel of Steel (2001), Joe Cinque's Consolation (2004) and This House of Grief – The Story of a Murder Trial (2014). She also contributed to La Mama, the Story of a Theatre (1988). Joe Cinque's Consolation details a notorious murder case in Canberra involving a law student, Anu Singh, who drugged and murdered her boyfriend. It was adapted into a feature film in 2016. The film had premiers at both the Melbourne Film Festival and the Toronto International Film Festival, where it was generally well received, although detractors felt that the absence of Garner's voice from the story impacted the film—James Robert Douglas, writing for The Guardian, stated the film adaptation contained the "bones but not the wisdom of Garner's book".

Themes

Garner has covered a broad range of themes in her work, ranging from feminism, love, loss, grief, ageing, illness, death, murder, betrayal, addiction and the duality of the human psyche, particularly in manifestations of "good" and "evil". Her earliest work, Monkey Grip, is well known for its untamed depiction of heroin addiction. Its central character, a single mother, falls in love with an addict in an inner-city bohemian Melbourne suburb, dotted with junkies and share houses, during the 1970s. Drug addiction, however, was not a subject Garner would revisit, aside from touching on recreational drug use among university students in Joe Cinque's Consolation. However, Monkey Grip did establish Garner's trademark theme of obsession, particularly in conjunction with love and sexuality—enmeshed with substance abuse mirroring the addiction of romantic love.

Some of her novels address "sexual desire and the family", exploring "the relationship between sexual behaviour and social organisation; the anarchic nature of desire and the orderly force of the institution of 'family'; the similarities and differences between collective households and nuclear families; the significance and the language of housework; [and] the idea of 'the house' as image, symbol, site and peace." Anne Myers, in an article written for The Sydney Morning Herald, recognised Garner's portrayals of the location of Melbourne as essential to Monkey Grip itself as any character: "Garner was writing Melbourne into the literary landscape and for the first time I saw my own world reflected back at me".

Joe Cinque's Consolation, This House of Grief and, to a lesser extent, The First Stone, were commentaries on the justice system in Australia, how (and if) it adequately responds to crime, as well as the question of culpability.

Craven comments that Garner is "always an extremely accurate writer in terms of the emotional states she depicts". Many of her books touch upon the inexplicable, irrational, and dark side to human behaviour—as well as Garner's attempts to understand human behaviour and sociology, which often eludes the average Australian and wider society, as well as the Australian justice system. In The Fate of The First Stone, Garner writes that she believes most people would prefer to keep incomprehensible stories of extreme behaviour at "arm's length" because it is "more comfortable, easier". Peter Craven wrote that Garner is fearless in her honesty: "she shows us what she does not know or is too blind to see: she shows us the poverty of the self in the face of impercipience caused by sentiment or anger, prejudice, ignorance or dumb incapacity." He further commented on her ability to sometimes identify with the story's perceived villain, "[the] transgressor who at some level shares our own fingerprints". Similarly, various critics and journalists have highlighted Garner's portrayal of "ordinary people" caught up in extraordinary experiences, or the everyday person who, "under life's unbearable pressures", has "surrendered to their darker selves". James Wood, in a profile on Garner published in The New Yorker, stated that her work is absorbed in issues of gender and class, which he writes are "not categories so much as structures of feeling, variously argued over, enjoyed, endured, and escaped".

Personal life
After her marriage to Bill Garner ended, Garner married two more times: to Jean-Jacques Portail (1980–85) and Australian writer Murray Bail (born 1941), from whom she separated in the late 1990s. She is no longer married. In her work, she has been open about her struggle with depression and her two abortions.

She has one child, Alice Garner (b. 1969), from her marriage to Bill Garner. Alice Garner is also an author, as well as a musician, teacher and historian.

In 2003, a portrait of Garner, titled True Stories, painted by Jenny Sages, was a finalist in the Archibald Prize.

Bibliography

Novels
Monkey Grip (1977)
Moving Out (1983)
The Children's Bach (1984)
Cosmo Cosmolino (1992)
The Spare Room (2008)

Short story collections
Honour & Other People's Children: Two Stories (1980)
Postcards from Surfers (1985)
My Hard Heart: Selected Fictions (1998)
Stories: The Collected Short Fiction (2017)

Screenplays
Monkey Grip (1982, directed and co-written by Ken Cameron)
Two Friends (1986, telemovie, directed by Jane Campion)
The Last Days of Chez Nous (1992, directed by Gillian Armstrong)

Non-fiction
La Mama: History of a Theatre (Liz Jones with Betty Burstall and Helen Garner, 1988)
The First Stone (1995)
True Stories: Selected Non-Fiction (1996)
And the Winner Is–: Eighteen Winning Stories from Eltham's Alan Marshall Award, Australian Authors, Both Winners and Judges, Discuss Their Work in a Book about Writing (authors Helen Garner and Jon Weaving) (1997)
The Feel of Steel (2001)
Joe Cinque's Consolation (2004)
Somewhere to Belong: A Blueprint for 21st Century Youth Clubs (authors Helen Garner and Julia Hargreaves) (2009)
This House of Grief – The Story of a Murder Trial (2014)
Regions of Thick-Ribbed Ice (2015)
Everywhere I Look (2016)
True Stories: The Collected Short Non-Fiction (2017)

Autobiographies
Yellow Notebook: Diaries Volume I 1978–1987 (2019)
One Day I'll Remember This: Diaries 1987–1995 (2020)
How To End A Story: Diaries 1995-1998 (2021)

Essays and reporting
"Man with the Pearl-White Cord", Dec 2005 – Jan 2006, No. 8, The Monthly
"Moving Experience", September 2005, No. 5, The Monthly
"Punishing Lauren", June 2005, No. 2, The Monthly
 "A Date with Darcy", 18 January 2013 The Sydney Morning Herald

Critical studies and reviews of Garner's work

Awards and nominations
 Monkey Grip
 1978 – National Book Council award
 The Children's Bach
 1986 – South Australian Premier's Awards
 Postcards from Surfers
 1986 – New South Wales Premier's Literary Awards, Christina Stead Prize for Fiction
 Two Friends
 1987 – New South Wales Premier's Literary Awards, Television Writing Award
 1987 – Best Screenplay in a Telefeature
 Cosmo Cosmolino
 1993 – Shortlisted for the Miles Franklin Award
 Did Daniel Have to Die?
 1993 – Walkley Award for Best Feature Writing, published in Time
 True Stories: Selected Non-fiction
 1997 – Nita Kibble Literary Award
 Joe Cinque's Consolation
 2004 – ABIA Book of the Year
 2005 – Ned Kelly Awards joint winner for Best True Crime
 The Spare Room
 2008 – Victorian Premier's Literary Awards, Vance Palmer Prize for Fiction
 2008 – Queensland Premier's Literary Awards Fiction Book Award
 2009 – Barbara Jefferis Award
 This House of Grief
 2015 – Ned Kelly Award – Best True Crime
 2015 – Longlisted Stella Prize
 2015 – Shortlisteds ABIA General Non-Fiction Book of the Year.
2015 - Shortlisted New South Wales Premier's Literary Awards
 2016 – Windham–Campbell Literature Prize for non-fiction works
 2016 – Western Australian Premier's Book Awards – non-fiction
 2016 – Western Australian Premier's Book Awards – overall prize
 Everywhere I Look
 2017 – Shortlist for The Indie Book Awards
 2006 – Melbourne Prize for Literature
2019 – Australia Council Award for Lifetime Achievement in Literature
2020 – Australian Book Industry Awards' Lloyd O'Neil Award and Hall of Fame

Critical studies and reviews
 Review of This House of Grief.

Notes

References
 Craven, Peter (1985) "Of war and needlework: the fiction of Helen Garner" in Meanjin, 44(2): 209–219

 Goldsworthy, Kerryn (1996) Australian Writers: Helen Garner, Melbourne, Oxford University Press
 Grenville, Kate and Woolfe, Sue (2001) Making Stories: How Ten Australian Novels Were Written, Allen & Unwin
 McPhee, Hilary (2001) Other People's Words, Sydney, Picador

External links

 

1942 births
Living people
Australian feminist writers
Australian women journalists
Australian journalists
Australian women short story writers
Australian women novelists
Australian women screenwriters
Writers from Victoria (Australia)
People from Geelong
University of Melbourne alumni
Ned Kelly Award winners
20th-century Australian novelists
20th-century Australian women writers
21st-century Australian novelists
21st-century Australian women writers
20th-century Australian short story writers
21st-century Australian short story writers
Grunge lit authors
Australian non-fiction crime writers
Women crime writers